Tři Sekery is a municipality and village in Cheb District in the Karlovy Vary Region of the Czech Republic. It has about 1,000 inhabitants.

Administrative parts
Villages of Chodovská Huť, Krásné and Tachovská Huť are administrative parts of Tři Sekery.

References

Villages in Cheb District